The 1957 Pacific Tigers football team represented the College of the Pacific during the 1957 NCAA University Division football season.

Pacific competed as an independent in 1957. They played home games in Pacific Memorial Stadium in Stockton, California. In their fifth season under head coach Jack Myers, the Tigers finished with a record of five wins, three losses and two ties (5–3–2). For the season they outscored their opponents 145–127.

Schedule

Team players in the NFL
The following College of the Pacific players were selected in the 1958 NFL Draft.

Notes

References

Pacific
Pacific Tigers football seasons
Pacific Tigers football